Coffee in Nicaragua may refer to:

 Coffee production in Nicaragua
 Coffee consumption in Nicaragua